This list of California companies includes notable companies that are, or once were, headquartered in California.

Companies based in California

0–9

 8minutenergy Renewables

A

 Abgent
 Acadia Pharmaceuticals
 Accelrys
 Activision
 Actuate Corporation
 AdGreetz
 Adobe Inc.
 Advanced Micro Devices
 AECOM
 Aerojet Rocketdyne Holdings
 AeroVironment
 Agilent Technologies
 Airpush
 Aldila
 AleSmith Brewing Company
 Alphabet Inc.
 American Apparel
 American Honda Motor Company
 Amgen
 Amy's Kitchen
 Anaheim Ducks Hockey Club, LLC
 Aniplex of America
 Antec
 Apple Inc.
 Applied Materials
 Applied Micro Circuits Corporation
 ArangoDB Inc.
 ARC Document Solutions
 Arkeia Software
 Aspen Education Group
 AstraQom
 Autodesk
 Avery Dennison

B

 Baker's Drive-Thru
 Ballast Point Brewing Company
 Banana Republic
 Bank of America Home Loans
 Bank of the West
 BatchMaster Software
 BAX Global
 bebe stores
 Beckman Coulter
 BEHR
 Belkin
 Big 5 Sporting Goods
 Bikram Yoga
 BioMarin Pharmaceutical
 Birdhouse Skateboards
 Birdwell
 Black Angus Steakhouse
 Blizzard Entertainment
 Blue Shield of California
 BlueJeans Network
 Bolthouse Farms
 Boost Mobile
 Bristol Farms
 Broadcom Inc.
 Brown Safe Manufacturing

C

 Calico
 California Pizza Kitchen
 Callaway Golf Company
 CamelBak
 CapitalG
 Carbon Sciences
 CareFusion
 Cathay Bank
 CBRE Group
 Century Theatres
 Charles Schwab Corporation
 Charlotte Russe
 The Cheesecake Factory
 Chevron Corporation
 Chicken of the Sea
 Circa
 Cisco Systems 
 City National Bank
 The Climate Corporation
 Clorox
 Cloudera
 CNET
 The Coffee Bean & Tea Leaf
 Corsair
 Cost Plus World Market
 Cubic Corporation

D

 DataStax
 DC Shoes
 DC Entertainment
 Deckers Outdoor Corporation
 Del Monte Foods
 Del Taco
 Delta Scientific Corporation
 Deluxe Distribution
 Deluxe Entertainment Services Group
 Diedrich Coffee
 DirecTV
 Disney
 Dodge & Cox
 Dole Food Company
 Drago restaurants
 DreamHost
 Driscoll's
 Ducommun
 Dwell
 Dwindle Distribution

E

 East West Bank
 eBay
 Edison International, owns Southern California Edison
 El Pollo Loco
 Elanex
 Electra Bicycle Company
 Electronic Arts
 Esurance
 EVGA Corporation
 Experian
 Extreme Pizza

F

 Facebook
 Facedown Records
 Factory 2-U
 Fallen Footwear
 Famous Stars and Straps
 Farmers Insurance Group
 Fatburger
 First American Corporation
 First Republic Bank
 Fisker Inc.
 Fisher Investments
 Fitbit
 Fleming's Prime Steakhouse & Wine Bar
 Flip Skateboards
 Food 4 Less
 Forever 21
 Fosters Freeze
 Fox Broadcasting Company
 Fox Racing
 Franklin Templeton Investments

G

 Gap Inc.
 Gateway, Inc.
 Genentech
 General Atomics
 Genesys
 Geni.com
 Ghirardelli Chocolate Company
 Gilead Sciences
 Girl Distribution Company
 Golden State Warriors, LLC
 Google LLC
 GoPro
 Granite Construction
 Green Flash Brewing Company
 GreenScreen Animals
 Grimmway Farms
 Grocery Outlet
 Guess
 Guitar Center
 Guittard Chocolate Company

H

 The Hat
 Health Net
 Herbalife Nutrition
 Hortonworks
 Hot Dog on a Stick
 Hot Topic
 HP
 Hurley International
 Hyundai Motor America

I

 IHOP
 In-N-Out Burger
 Independent Truck Company
 Industrial Light & Magic 
 Ingram Micro
 Insider Pages
 Intel
 IntelliCorp
 Intuit
 Iron Grip Barbell Company

J

 J.D. Power
 Jack in the Box
 Jacuzzi
 Jazzercise
 JBL
 Jelly Belly
 Jenny Craig, Inc.
 Jimboy's Tacos
 Johnny Rockets
 JRK Property Holdings
 Juicy Juice
 Juniper Networks

K

 K-Swiss
 Kaiser Permanente
 Karl Strauss Brewing Company
 Kashi
 KB Home
 Keenan & Associates
 Kikkoman
 Kingston Technology
 KLA-Tencor
 Klasky Csupo
 Kleiner Perkins
 Kyocera Communications, Inc.

L

 LA Fitness
 Labroots
 Lakai Limited Footwear
 Lam Research
 Landmark Worldwide
 Laserfiche
 Lazy Acres Market
 Leap Wireless
 Levi Strauss & Co.
 Lexicon Branding
 Linksys
 Lionsgate
 Live Nation Entertainment
 Logitech
 Los Angeles Clippers Inc.
 Los Angeles Kings, LLC
 Los Angeles Lakers Inc.
 LRAD Corporation
 Lucas Oil
 LucasArts
 Lucasfilm
 Lucid Motors
 Lucky Brand Jeans
 Lucky Stores

M

 Macerich
 Mag Instrument, Inc. 
 Mapbox
 Mattel
 Maxim Integrated
 Maxtor
 Maxwell Technologies
 Mazda North American Operations
 McAfee
 The McClatchy Company
 McKesson Corporation
 Mel Bernie Company
 Mendocino Redwood Company
 Mercury General
 Metro-Goldwyn-Mayer
 Microtek
 MindTouch
 Mitsubishi Motors North America, Inc.
 Monster Energy
 Mozilla Corporation
 Music World Corporation

N

 Naked Juice
 National Steel and Shipbuilding Company 
 Nest Labs
 Nestlé USA - Beverages Division
 NetApp
 Netflix
 Netgear
 NetZero
 Neurocrine Biosciences
 Newegg
 NHS, Inc.
 Niman Ranch
 Nintendo
 The North Face
 NOZA, Inc.
 Nugget Markets
 Nvidia

O

 Oakley, Inc.
 Ocean Pacific
 OCZ
 Old Navy
 OneWest Bank
 Oracle Corporation
 O'Reilly Media
 Original Tommy's
 Osiris Shoes

P

 Pacific Gas and Electric Company
 Pacific Lumber Company
 PacSun
 Panavision
 Panda Express
 Panda Inn
 PANTA
 Paramount Petroleum
 Paramount Pictures
 Parsons Corporation
 Party America
 Pat & Oscar's
 Pavilions
 Paxton Automotive
 PayPal
 PC World
 Peet's Coffee
 Pelican Products
 PeoplePC
 Permanente Quarry
 Petco
 Piggybackr
 Pinnacle Systems
 Pixar
 Plan B Skateboards
 PMI Group
 Powell Peralta
 PowerColor
 Premiere Networks
 Princess Cruises
 Public Storage

Q

 Qualcomm
 Quantum Corporation
 Quest Software
 Quiksilver

R

 Rakuten.com
 Raley's Supermarkets
 Ralphs
 Rambus
 Rasta Taco
 Real Mex Restaurants
 Red Digital Cinema
 Reliance Steel & Aluminum Co.
 Rentech
 Rescue One Financial
 Restoration Hardware
 RingCentral
 Riot Games
 Rivian
 Robinson Helicopter Company
 Roblox
 Rockstar San Diego
 Ross Stores
 Round Table Pizza
 Rubio's Coastal Grill

S

 Safeway Inc.
 Saitek
 Saleen
 Salem Media Group
 Samsung Activewear
 Samsung Semiconductor
 San Jose Sharks, LLC
 SanDisk
 Sanmina Corporation
 SAP Ariba
 Save Mart Supermarkets
 Scaled Composites
 Scharffen Berger Chocolate Maker
 Scion
 SD Entertainment & Kidtoon Films
 Seagate Technology
 See's Candies
 Sempra Energy
 Sendio
 Sephora (North American headquarters) 
 Sequenom
 ServiceNow
 Shakey's Pizza
 Shea Homes
 Shubb
 Skechers
 Solar Turbines
 Sole Technology
 Sony Pictures Entertainment
 Souplantation
 SpaceDev
 The Spaceship Company
 SpaceX
 SpeakerCraft
 SSL
 Stater Bros.
 Stone Brewing Co.
 Sun-Maid
 Sunsweet Growers
 SureFire
 Surf Diva
 Sutter Health
 Symantec
 Synaptics

T

 Taco Bell
 Tapatio Foods
 Tastee-Freez
 Taylor Guitars
 TaylorMade
 Technicolor USA
 Teledyne Technologies
 Tesla, Inc.
 Thrasher
 Ticketmaster
 Togo's
 Toshiba America Consumer Products (TACP) Inc., Toshiba America Information Systems Inc., Toshiba America Medical Systems Inc., and Toshiba America Mri Inc.
 Toyota Motor Sales, U.S.A., Inc.
 Trader Joe's
 Transworld Skateboarding
 True Religion
 Twitter
 TYR Sport, Inc.

U

 Undrest
 Universal Pictures
 Upper Deck Company
 UTStarcom

V

 Vans
 Varian Medical Systems
 Veritas Technologies
 Viasat, Inc.
 ViewSonic
 Virgin Galactic
 Visa Inc.
 Vivid Entertainment
 Viz Media
 VMware
 Volcom
 Vons

W

 Warner Bros.
 Waymo
 WD-40 Company
 WebAssist
 Wells Fargo
 West Air
 Westamerica Bank
 Western Digital
 Western Mutual Insurance Group
 Wetzel's Pretzels
 Wienerschnitzel
 Williams-Sonoma, Inc.
 Winchell's Donuts
 Wolfgang Puck Worldwide Inc.

X

 X 
 Xilinx
 Xirrus

Y

 Yahoo!
 Yelp
 You Bar
 YouTube
 Yum-Yum Donuts

Z

 Zero Skateboards
 Zoom (software)

Companies formerly based in California

A

 Adaptec
 Adio
 Aerojet
 AirCal
 Allergan
 Ameriflight 
 Ameriquest Mortgage 
 Andronico's
 Application Networks
 Averatec

B

 Baja Fresh
 Bank of California
 Bechtel
 Black Box Distribution
 BMW of North America
 Boeing Phantom Works
 Brio Technology
 Bubba Gump Shrimp Company
 Building Materials Holding Corporation

C

 California Lawyer
 Calpine
 Carvin Corporation
 Caterpillar Inc.
 Champion
 Chiron Corporation
 Circle K
 CKE Restaurants, parent of Carl's Jr., Hardee's, Green Burrito, and Red Burrito
 Coco's Bakery
 Computer Sciences Corporation
 Con-way
 Conexant
 ConSentry Networks
 Costco
 Covad
 Cricket Wireless
 Crowley Maritime
 Cunard Line

D

 Decillionix
 DIC Entertainment

E

 E-Loan
 Elephant Bar
 Emerson Network Power
 Euphonix

F

 Fleetwood Enterprises
 Frederick's of Hollywood
 Fresh Choice

G

 Genencor
 Golden West Financial
 Good Earth Tea
 Gottschalks 
 Gulf Oil
 Gymboree

H

 Häagen-Dazs
 Harris Company
 Hilton Hotels & Resorts

I

 International Lease Finance Corporation
 INVESTools

J

 Jacobs Engineering Group
 Jamba Juice

K

 K2 Sports
 Kerio Technologies

L

 Longs Drugs
 Los Angeles Airways
 Lovecraft Biofuels
 LPL Financial
 LSI Corporation

M

 Mad Catz
 Malibu Boats
 Matson, Inc.
 Maxtor
 Maxygen
 Memorex
 Mervyn's 
 Metropolitan West Financial
 Microsoft
 Miro Technologies

N

 National Semiconductor
 Nationwide Asset Services
 Navigenics
 NBCUniversal
 Northrop Grumman
 Novellus Systems
 NUMMI

O

 Occidental Petroleum

P

 Pacer International
 Pacific Southwest Airlines
 Palm, Inc.
 Polar Air Cargo

R

 Riverdeep
 Rosewill
 Ryan Aeronautical

S

 SAIC
 Sequoia Voting Systems
 The Sharper Image
 Silicon Graphics
 SIPphone 
 Sirna Therapeutics
 The Sleep Train
 Solectron
 Spansion
 Submarina
 Sun Microsystems
 SwoopThat.com
 SYSTAT

U

 Unified Grocers
 Union Bank N.A.
 URS Corporation

V

 Verisign
 Vigor Gaming
 Virgin America
Vans

W

 Waste Connections
 Watson Pharmaceuticals
 West Coast Choppers

X

 XCOR Aerospace

See also

List of companies based in the San Francisco Bay Area, with further subsets by city

References

 

California